Rockstar Games Toronto ULC (trade name: Rockstar Toronto; formerly Imagexcel, Alternative Reality Technologies, and Rockstar Canada) is a Canadian video game developer and a studio of Rockstar Games based in Oakville, Ontario. The company was established as Imagexcel in the early 1980s and developed more than fifteen games under that name, including Quarantine, which was published by GameTek in 1994. The publisher bought the studio's assets through its Alternative Reality Technologies subsidiary in March 1995 and then sold Alternative Reality Technologies to Take-Two Interactive in July 1997. The studio became part of Take-Two's Rockstar Games label as Rockstar Canada in 1999 and was renamed Rockstar Toronto in 2002 when Take-Two acquired Rockstar Vancouver. Under Rockstar Games, the studio developed the 2005 game The Warriors, based on the 1979 film of the same name, as well as several ports, including the Windows versions of Grand Theft Auto IV, Grand Theft Auto: Episodes from Liberty City, Max Payne 3, and Grand Theft Auto V. In July 2012, Rockstar Vancouver was merged into Rockstar Toronto, which then moved into larger offices.

History 
Rockstar Toronto was established as Imagexcel in the early 1980s, "before the time of He-Man". The studio developed roughly fifteen games across multiple systems until 1995. It began developing a proprietary game engine in 1993, as well as a complementary game in collaboration with GameTek in December that year. Rod Humble, as GameTek's executive producer, initially wrote a script titled Bloods that revolved around gang warfare. When the company sent a revision thereof to Imagexcel, the studio reworked the concept into what became Quarantine. Humble considered the new version a "far surperior game". In October 1994, Imagexcel comprised programmer and managing partner Kevin Hoare, programmers Ed Zolnieryk and Andy Brownbill, and artists Greg Bick and Ray Larabie. GameTek released the game in the same month. On 9 March 1995, the publisher announced its acquisition Imagexcel's assets through a newly founded subsidiary, Alternative Reality Technologies. The transaction included Quarantines engine, which GameTek intended to use in other games. Hoare, Zolnieryk, Bick, and Larabie formed the core of GameTek's Canadian development operations. After the acquisition, the studio was also referred to as GameTek Canada.

Take-Two Interactive bought several assets from GameTek in July 1997, including Alternative Reality Technologies, GameTek's European offices, and distribution rights for games including Dark Colony. The Alternative Reality Technologies team became part of Take-Two's Rockstar Games label in 1999 as Rockstar Canada. The studio then created two expansion packs for the 1997 game Grand Theft Auto: London 1969 and London 1961, both released in 1999. It developed ports of Rockstar Games' Oni and Max Payne for the PlayStation 2 that were released in 2001. When Take-Two acquired Barking Dog Studios and renamed it Rockstar Vancouver in August 2002, Rockstar Canada was renamed Rockstar Toronto to avert confusion between the two. At the same time, Take-Two announced that Rockstar Toronto was working on a video game adaptation of the 1979 film The Warriors. The eponymous game was first shown at E3 2005 before being released in October that year. A spiritual successor, internally known as We Are the Mods, was planned at the time. After The Warriors, Rockstar Toronto developed further ports: It brought Manhunt 2 and Bully: Scholarship Edition to the Wii, and Grand Theft Auto IV, Grand Theft Auto: Episodes from Liberty City, and Max Payne 3 to Windows.

In July 2012, Rockstar Games announced Rockstar Toronto would be moving into larger, custom-built offices within Oakville, Ontario. Rockstar Vancouver was merged into Rockstar Toronto and the former's thirty-five employees were given the option to relocate to Rockstar Toronto or any other Rockstar Games studio. The Government of Ontario contributed  to this expansion. Jennifer Kolbe, Rockstar Games' vice-president of publishing and operations, stated creating a single Canadian team that would "make for a powerful creative force on future projects", while making room for fifty new positions at the studio. In November 2012, Rockstar Toronto's legal entity, Rockstar Toronto Inc., was transitioned from Ontario to British Columbia as Rockstar Games Toronto Inc. and then transformed to Rockstar Games Toronto ULC, an unlimited liability corporation.

Rockstar Toronto later ported Grand Theft Auto V to Windows. This version was initially scheduled to be released alongside the PlayStation 4 and Xbox One versions in 2014. The port was delayed to April 2015, which the studio attributed to optimizations and the integration of a built-in video editor, which is exclusive to this release. Rockstar Games referred to the Windows port as the game's "ultimate" edition. On 24 December 2020,  worth of newly delivered computer equipment and accessories were stolen from Rockstar Toronto's offices. The incident was the first in a string of robberies in Oakville that continued until 23 January 2021. The suspect, a 30-year-old woman, was arrested on 25 January.

Games developed

Cancelled 
 We Are the Mods

References 

1995 mergers and acquisitions
1997 mergers and acquisitions
Canadian subsidiaries of foreign companies
Companies based in Oakville, Ontario
Rockstar Games subsidiaries
Take-Two Interactive divisions and subsidiaries
Video game companies of Canada
Video game development companies